The Rayleigh Rockets were a  Speedway team which operated from 1949 until their closure in 1973 from the Rayleigh Weir Stadium in Rayleigh, Essex .

History
The Rockets inaugural league season was in 1949 Speedway National League Division Three, where they finished in 12th place. After two more seasons in Division Three they joined the Southern League (which was a new name for the third division). The became champions of the league in 1952 and 1953.

The Rockets closed in 1958 but re-opened again in 1960 and entered the Provincial League. The Provincial league was the second division of speedway at the time and Rayleigh won their third piece of silverware after winning the 1960 Provincial Speedway League.

In 1964, they entered a regional Metropolitan League but this was the last league racing seen until 1968, when Len Silver took over as promoter. 

The Rockets rode at the stadium until 1973 when it was announced that the stadium had been sold to developers and the Rockets would need to find a new home. Len Silver took the Rockets to Hoddesdon in Hertfordshire to start the 1974 season as the Rye House Rockets.  The former site of Rayleigh Stadium is now a retail park.  

Many of the former Rayleigh fans used to support the former Essex Speedway team, the Lakeside Hammers, who used to race at the Arena Essex Raceway, next to the Lakeside Shopping Centre, up until their closure in 2017.

Season summary

References

Speedway teams in Essex
Defunct British speedway teams
Rayleigh, Essex
1949 establishments in England
Sports clubs established in 1949
1973 disestablishments in England
Sports clubs disestablished in 1973